WFIR (960 kHz "WFIR 960 AM - 107.3 FM") is a commercial AM radio station licensed to Roanoke, Virginia, and serving the Roanoke Valley.  It airs a news/talk radio format and is owned and operated by Mel Wheeler, Inc.  WFIR's studios and offices are on Electric Road in Roanoke.

WFIR broadcasts at 10,000 watts non-directional by day.  But at night, to avoid interfering with other stations on AM 960, it reduces power to 5,000 watts and uses a directional antenna. The AM transmitter is off Brandon Avenue SW.  Programming is also heard on two FM translators: W297BC 107.3 MHz, off Catawba Valley Drive in Roanoke, and W233CK 94.5 MHz in Troutville.

Local news and talk programs air in weekday morning and afternoon drive times, with syndicated shows heard the rest of day, including The Glenn Beck Program, The Clay Travis and Buck Sexton Show, The Sean Hannity Show, The Ramsey Show with Dave Ramsey, The Mark Levin Show, Ground Zero with Clyde Lewis and Coast to Coast AM with George Noory. Weekends feature shows on money, religion, technology, law, guns, home repair and gardening. Syndicated weekend programs include The Kim Komando Show, Rich DeMuro on Tech, Somewhere in Time with Art Bell, Tom Gresham's Gun Talk and Bill Handel on the Law. World and national news from ABC News Radio is heard at the beginning of most hours.

Translators
In addition to the main station, WFIR is relayed by two FM translators to widen its broadcast area.

History
On its website, WFIR says it was the second radio station to sign-on in Virginia.  Frank E. Maddox first began experimenting with amateur radio broadcasts in Roanoke as 3BIY in the early 1920s.  His employer, the Richardson-Wayland Electrical Company, asked him to take his knowledge and put a commercial radio station on the air in 1924.  The company sold radios but people in the Roanoke area had no local stations to listen to.  Their radios could only pick up distant signals after sunset.  On June 20, 1924, WDBJ officially went on the air. The studios were in the back of the company's store.  The new station broadcast at 1310 kHz, with 20 watts of power.  The first program was a live banjo player.
 	
In 1926, the station moved to new studios at The American Theater on Jefferson Street and Campbell Avenue in Roanoke.  In 1929, WDBJ began broadcasting at 930 kHz at 500 watts power, and also became the Roanoke affiliate of CBS Radio—a link that would last for more than 70 years. The station was sold to The Roanoke Times newspaper in 1931.  Power increased to 1000 watts in 1934.  In 1939, Chief Engineer J.W. Robertson increased the power to 5000 watts.  In 1941, under the North American Regional Broadcasting Agreement or NARBA, the station moved to its current dial position at AM 960.  During the 1940s, 50s and 60s, WDBJ mixed bluegrass music and country music with adult standards and middle of the road popular tunes, while also carrying CBS Network dramas, comedies and sports.  In October 1955, WDBJ-TV signed on the air as Roanoke's CBS television affiliate.
 	
Times-World Corporation, owner of the Times, merged with Landmark Communications in 1969.  As a condition of the merger, Times-World sold off its broadcasting properties. Channel 7 kept the WDBJ call letters while AM 960 became WFIR, standing for First in Roanoke, a reminder that it was the first broadcasting operation in the Roanoke Valley.  In 1979, the station was purchased by Jim Gibbons, the former play-by-play announcer for the Washington Redskins football team.  Gibbons added more news and sports into the program schedule.  In 1979, WFIR began carrying the syndicated Larry King Show overnight, and later, family financial adviser Bruce Williams in the evening.  Through the 1980s, WFIR aired a full service adult contemporary format, keeping WFIR among the top ten radio stations in the Roanoke-Lynchburg media market ratings, despite the shift to FM radio listening.  In 1987, the station added Rush Limbaugh to its midday schedule, one of his first affiliates.

In 1989 WFIR became a full-time News/Talk radio station.  In the year 2000, it was bought by Mel Wheeler, Inc., which owns eight radio stations in the Roanoke-Lynchburg market.  In 2001, WFIR switched from CBS Radio News to ABC News Radio hourly newscasts in order to be able to air Paul Harvey news which was dropped from WROV-AM several years earlier.

References

External links
 960 AM and FM 107.3 WFIR Online

1924 establishments in Virginia
News and talk radio stations in the United States
Radio stations established in 1924
FIR